How Beautiful We Were is an environment-themed novel written by Cameroonian–American novelist Imbolo Mbue. It is the second novel written by Mbue. Set in a fictional village in Africa, it follows of a set of villagers who challenge the government and an American oil company.

Background and inspiration 
Mbue's novel was influenced by her childhood days in Cameroon. Mbue started writing the novel seventeen years prior to publishing Behold the Dreamers in 2016.
Mbue's "interest was more in writing a story about what happens when a group of people decides to push back against a powerful corporation." She cited Ken Saro-Wiwa and the environmental issues in the Niger Delta as her major influence.

Plot summary 
The story takes us to the village of Kosawa—a fictional settlement in Africa under a monarch system of government.
The populace is angered by the entrance of the American oil firm Pexton, which causes an oil spill to the point of causing fatal diseases. 
Seeing the sufferings of his people, Kanga—the village mad man—convinces the villager to lead a revolts but is opposed by the president of the country—a man wearing a "leopard skin hat tilted to the right".
The revolution later involves young adults, particularly Thula who is described as a woman of fire.
Thula who had just graduated from a college in the United States forges a militant organisation which she uses to spearhead the social protest against her people.
The company in turn, bribes some of the statesmen with scholarships, transports while the government grants them statutes—sowing a seed of discord in the village.

Characters 
 Kanga — described as the village mad man, Kanga convinces Thula to lead a revolt against the government and Pexton.
 Thula Nangi — a young woman who takes over from Kanga in revolting using her knowledge from protest in the United States to dialogue with the government an Pexton.
 Yaya — Thula's grandmother.

Reception 
It was listed in Brittle Paper's Notable Books of 2021.

References 

2021 novels
Environmental fiction books